Nate Johnson, nicknamed "Speedball", is an American former Negro league pitcher who played in the 1920s.

Johnson made his Negro leagues debut in 1922 with the Bacharach Giants. He played for the club again in 1923, and also played for the Brooklyn Royal Giants that season.

References

External links
 and Baseball-Reference Black Baseball stats and Seamheads

Year of birth missing
Place of birth missing
Bacharach Giants players
Brooklyn Royal Giants players
Baseball pitchers